Airspeeder is an electric flying vehicle racing series based in London, United Kingdom. The aircraft use electric vertical take-off and landing (eVTOL) technology and are designed to be crewed by human pilots. The first remotely-piloted drag race between two Airspeeder craft took place in November 2021. A remotely-piloted racing series (Airspeeder EXA) began in 2022.

History
The concept for a human-piloted, flying vehicle racing series was developed by Matt Pearson. His company developed a prototype over the course of two years in a warehouse in Sydney, Australia. The craft, an eVTOL quadcopter, was debuted in December 2017.

The Airspeeder Mk4, an eight-rotor version of the vehicle, was unveiled in 2019. In April 2020, Airspeeder raised an undisclosed amount in a seed funding round led by Saltwater Capital, Jelix Ventures, Equals, and DHL. Throughout this time, Airspeeder craft made frequent test runs which were documented on the Airspeeder YouTube channel.

In June 2021, a successful remote test flight of an Airspeeder Mk3 octocopter craft took place in the South Australian desert. It was the first successful test flight. The first remotely-piloted drag race between two Airspeeder craft took place again in the South Australian desert in November 2021. Also in 2021, Airspeeder received additional funding from Telstra. In January 2022, Airspeeder announced the first three pilots (Fabio Tischler, Emily Duggan, and Zephatali Walsh) who would remotely operate craft for the Airspeeder EXA series. The inaugural edition of the EXA series is planned to take place in 2022 and consist of three remotely-operated races in three different countries.

Vehicles

The Mk3 and Mk4 Airspeeder versions are designed for racing with eight propellers and a carbon-fiber composite body. Each vehicle is also equipped with a collision avoidance system that uses lidar, radar, and machine vision to avoid in-air crashes. Mk3 speeders are designed to be operated remotely while Mk4 speeders are intended to be flown with pilots in the cockpit.

Performance evolution
 2021 - Without pilots, Airspeeder Mk3 weighed around 100 kilograms (220 pounds) and could reach speeds of around 200 kilometers per hour (124 miles per hour). The speeders were powered by electric batteries that could provide 10 to 15 minutes of power. Batteries were intended to be replaced mid-race by pit crews.
 2023 - With pilot, Airspeeder Mk4 has a take-off weight (MTOW) of 950kg, and can achieve a top speed of 360 kph (225 mph) in 30 seconds from a standing start. 1,000 kW (1,340 horsepower) Thunderstrike Hydrogen Turbogenerator has a range of 300km (188 miles).

Race format
For the 2022 Airspeeder EXA Series, pilots will operate their speeders remotely using VR first-person view haptic suits. Although Airspeeder has yet to name racing locations, it has previously targeted desert locales like Coober Pedy in South Australia or the Mojave Desert in the U.S. state of California. Airspeeder has also noted that races could theoretically take place in any terrain on "sky tracks" that utilize augmented reality. The series currently has three confirmed pilots, but Airspeeder plans on increasing that to five by the start of the season.

References

External links
Official website
EXA Series website

Sports leagues in Australia
Sports leagues established in 2022